Ana Díaz is a Buenos Aires Premetro station. The station is located between Pola and Centro Cívico on the side branch leading to Centro Cívico. It was opened on 29 April 1987 together with most other stations of Premetro.

References

Buenos Aires PreMetro stations
1987 establishments in Argentina
Railway stations opened in 1987